2170 may refer to:

 2170 (number), a number in the 2000-3000 range
 2170 CE/AD, a year (12170 on the Holocene calendar; 120 AP); and its associated decade (2170s)
 2170 BC/BCE, a year (7931 on the Holocene calendar; -2169 on the ISO calendar; 3219 BP); and its associated decade (2170s B.C./BCE)
 2170 battery (aka 21700), a size form factor of cylindrical lithium-ion rechargeable battery cells
 2170 Byelorussia (asteroid #2170), an asteroid named Byelorussia, the 2170th asteroid registered
 Queensland Railways 2170 class, a class of diesel-electric locomotive operated by Queensland Railways
 U+2170x (Unicode character block), see List of CJK Unified Ideographs Extension B (Part 2 of 7)
 U+2170 (Unicode character), see List of Latin letters by shape
 hex 2170 (JIS character), see List of Japanese typographic symbols

See also

 
 , a U.S. Navy salvage tug
 Farm to Market Road 2170 (FM-2170), a road in Texas, USA
 LTE frequency band 1 (Long Term Evolution / 4G) downlink frequencies 2110–2170MHz
 S-DMB (S-Band Digital Media Broadcasting) using 2170–2200 MHz
 UNSC Resolution 2170, a 2014 UN Security Council resolution for international military intervention against ISIL
 The Thing Happens: A.D. 2170 (stageplay), a 1910s play written by George Bernard Shaw
 
 21700 (disambiguation)
 217 (disambiguation)
 217 (number) 
 217 (ISO year +217; A.D. 217 / 217 CE)